Anna Felicitas Sarholz (born 5 July 1992) is a German footballer. She last played and also served as the goalkeeping coach for the women's section of RB Leipzig.

Honours

1. FFC Turbine Potsdam 
Bundesliga: Winner (4) 2008–09, 2009–10, 2010–11, 2011–12
German Cup: Runner-up (1) 2008–09
UEFA Women's Champions League: Winner (1) 2009–10
DFB-Hallenpokal: Winner (3) 2010, 2013, 2014

Germany 
FIFA U-17 Women's World Cup: Third place 2008
UEFA Women's Under-17 Championship: Winner (2) 2008, 2009

References

External links 
 
 Career stats at weltfussball.de 

1992 births
Living people
Footballers from Cologne
German women's footballers
1. FFC Turbine Potsdam players
Women's association football goalkeepers